"Dead Man (Carry Me)" is a song written and performed by Jars of Clay. It is the first radio single from their 2006 studio album, Good Monsters. A live concert version of the song appears on the Live Monsters EP, while the album version appears on the compilation albums Indoor Picnic Music (2006, Nettwerk), Penny Candy (2006, Nettwerk), and WOW Hits 2007 (2006, EMI Christian Music Group). A music video for the song was released in 2007, which was compiled from concert video footage taken by fans by means of their mobile phones. The radio edited version is less "heavy" than the album version, featuring keyboards louder than electric guitars.

Track listing
"Dead Man (Carry Me)" (Edit) - 3:21 (Dan Haseltine, Charlie Lowell, Stephen Mason, Matt Odmark)

Charts
 No. 20, Christian AC
 No. 4, Christian CHR

Awards  

In 2007, the song was nominated for a Dove Award for Pop/Contemporary Recorded Song of the Year at the 38th GMA Dove Awards.

References

External links
Official music video on YouTube

2006 singles
Jars of Clay songs
Songs written by Dan Haseltine
Songs written by Charlie Lowell
Songs written by Stephen Mason (musician)
Songs written by Matt Odmark
2006 songs